Yiyang is a county under the administration of the prefecture-level city of Luoyang city, Henan province, China, historically called Shou'an County. Fuchang County of the Tang and Song dynasties was located in Yiyang. In 1072 Fuchang was merged into Shou'an, and in 1186 Shou'an was renamed as Yiyang.

Administrative divisions
As 2012, this county is divided to 7 towns and 10 townships.
Towns

Townships

Climate

Notable people 

 Liang Jun (梁 軍) - teacher and activist

References

County-level divisions of Henan
Luoyang